The Raesor S50T is a 7-seater MPV produced by Changan Automobile under the Raesor (Ruixing) series of the Kaicene sub-brand.

Overview

The Raesor S50T debuted in the 2017 and was launched on the Chinese auto market with prices ranging from 61,900 yuan to 71,900 yuan at launch. 

The Raesor S50T seats seven. The power of the Raesor S50T comes from a 1.6 liter inline-four engine producing 116hp and 150nm of torque and a 1.6 liter inline-four turbo engine producing 150hp and 110nm of torque. The front suspension is McPherson and rear suspension is multi-link dependent design. The S50T also features alloys and disc brakes for all four wheels on all trim levels.

The Raesor S50T is manufactured by Changan's commercial division, Chana, later known as Kaicene.

References

External links
S50 Official website 

Ruixing S50T
Compact MPVs
Front-wheel-drive vehicles
Cars of China
Cars introduced in 2018